Craugastor decoratus is a species of frog in the family Craugastoridae.
It is endemic to Mexico.
Its natural habitats are subtropical or tropical moist montane forests, pastureland, and rural gardens.
It is threatened by habitat loss.

References

decoratus
Amphibians described in 1942
Taxonomy articles created by Polbot